Barry Davies (born 5 March 1981 in Carmarthen, Wales) is a retired Welsh rugby union footballer. Davies has also been capped by Wales at international level. His primary position was at fullback.

Club career 
Davies joined Llanelli as a 19-year-old from Carmarthen Athletic. He has since made over 100 appearances for Llanelli and the Llanelli Scarlets. During his career at Stradey Park he became the region's top try scorer, racking up 37 tries in his lengthy stay at the region.

It came to light quite late in his Llanelli Scarlets career that Davies was quite a remarkable goal kicker. During and ever since the 2003 season, Davies would attempt kicks at goal from long distances. His greatest kick was against Ulster in the Celtic League at Ravenhill from an estimated distance of 59 metres. Though he did not perform these kicks often, it was this sort of play on the pitch that earned him the nickname 'Barry the boot' from one commentator during the EDF Energy and then again during the Powergen Cup semi-final against Bath.

In 2007, Davies joined French club CA Brive, and in June 2009, he joined the Ospreys. He was released by the Ospreys in July 2012.

Davies joined Jersey Reds in 2012, spending one season with the Championship side. Following his departure from Jersey, Davies joined Coventry R.F.C. He signed on with the club for one more season, in 2014.

International career 
Davies was first included in the Welsh squad in 2004, for the Six Nations, following injuries to Garan Evans and Hal Luscombe. 

After scoring a memorable try for the Scarlets against Northampton Saints in the Heineken Cup pool stages, where the Scarlets needed to win the game to qualify for the quarter-finals, Davies was again called up, this time for the 2004 June rugby union tests. He was an unused bench replacement in a match against Argentina on 19 June.

He made his debut for Wales in early 2006, during the Six Nations that year. He came off the bench in a match against Ireland at Lansdowne Road, which Wales lost 31–5.

References

External links
WRU article
Barry Davies called into Wales squad

1981 births
Living people
Rugby union fullbacks
Welsh rugby union players
Wales international rugby union players
Llanelli RFC players
Scarlets players
CA Brive players
Ospreys (rugby union) players
Expatriate rugby union players in France
British expatriates in France
Rugby union players from Carmarthen
Welsh expatriate rugby union players